Bastiaan Paschier (Bas) Paternotte (born 1 September 1976 in Drachten) is a Dutch political reporter for the blogs ThePostOnline.nl  (formerly DeJaap.nl) and GeenStijl and formerly for the magazine HP/De Tijd. and a political commentator on the PowNed radio programme Echte Jannen (segment: Haagse Geluid met Bas Paternotte) on Radio 1.

He used to be a political journalist for the Dutch Metro newspaper.

References

External links
 

1976 births
Living people
Dutch journalists
Dutch political commentators
People from Drachten